The Tatra 57 are a series of two-door compact cars, built by Czechoslovakian company Tatra from 1932. They are popularly known by the nickname "Hadimrška".

Tatra updated the model as the 57A in 1936, and as 57B in 1938. A military adaptation, the 57K, (for Kübelwagen) was introduced in 1941. Through 1945, more than 5,000 Tatra Kübelwagens were built.

All versions have a characteristic Tatra backbone chassis, with the drive-shaft running encased in its central structural tube.

Tatra ended production of the 57K in 1947, and of the 57B in 1949. With that the company altogether withdrew from making compact cars; from 1948 its smallest model was the 2 litre Tatra 600.

History

Tatra 57
The Tatra type 57, introduced in 1931, succeeded the Tatra 12. Styling continued the same streamlined, closed nose front as its predecessors – Type 11 and 12. It has a 1,155 cc overhead valve flat-four engine that produces . Its fuel consumption is between eight and 10 litres per 100 km. Bodies offered included a four-seat saloon, four-seat convertible and two-seat convertible. All were two-door.

Tatra 57A
In 1935 Tatra replaced the Type 57 with the 57A – changing to a more conventional open front grille design. The body was restyled, and given a radiator grille similar to that of the larger Tatra 75. A commercial van version was offered.

Tatra 57B
In 1938 Tatra replaced the Type 57A with the 57B.

Tatra 57K

In 1941, Tatra added the 57K Kübelwagen, which was a military four-door convertible for the German Wehrmacht in World War II, officially designated as "Leichter Personenkraftwagen" (le. Pkw.) Tatra 57K.

From 1941 to 1945, Tatra manufactured 5,415 units of the Tatra T 57 K, which were frequently used by Nazi police forces. Production of this model further continued through 1947.

See also
Tatra V570

References

Bibliography

External links

1940s cars
Automobiles with backbone chassis
Cars powered by boxer engines
Cars introduced in 1936
Coupés
Rear-wheel-drive vehicles
57
Cars introduced in 1932